Mauricio Damián Felipe Herrera (born 8 October 1990) is a Uruguayan footballer who plays as a defender for Uruguay Montevideo in the Uruguayan Segunda División.

References

External links
Profile at ESPN FC

1990 births
Living people
Uruguayan footballers
Association football defenders
Liverpool F.C. (Montevideo) players
Rampla Juniors players
Colón F.C. players
Uruguay Montevideo players
Uruguayan Primera División players
Uruguayan Segunda División players